William Duke Coleridge, 5th Baron Coleridge, DL (born 18 June 1937), is an hereditary peer who lives in Ottery St Mary in Devon, England.

Biography
The son of Richard Coleridge, 4th Baron Coleridge, Coleridge was educated at Eton College in Berkshire, England, and at the Royal Military Academy Sandhurst in Berkshire. He served as an officer in the Coldstream Guards in Kenya between 1961 and 1963. Coleridge was Commander of the Guards Independent Parachute Company between 1970 and 1972. He was Governor of the Royal West of England School for the Deaf. He retired from the British Army's Coldstream Guards with the rank of Major in 1977. He succeeded to the title of 5th Baron Coleridge of Ottery St. Mary in 1984 on the death of his father, the 4th Baron.

Coleridge married Everild Tania Hambrough, the daughter of Lieutenant Colonel Beauchamp Hambrough, on 17 February 1962. They have three children, including Coleridge's only son, the Hon. James Duke Coleridge (b. 5 June 1967), the present heir to the barony. A daughter is the model and actress Tania Harcourt-Cooze. The marriage was dissolved in 1977. Later that year he married nurse and explorer Pamela Baker (b. 24 July 1947; d. 12 August 2018), daughter of George William Baker. He has two children from this second marriage. Lady Pamela Coleridge died on 12 August 2018. He married for the third time on 15 September 2020. His third wife is Rosemary, Viscountess Exmouth, 78. It is her third marriage also.

The ancestral home is The Chanter's House in Ottery St Mary in Devon. Coleridge was the last family member to live there because the increasing costs of maintaining the property caused the family trust in October 2006 to put the property up for sale and auction the contents. In 1999 Coleridge had attempted to lease part of the family estate in order to raise money to prevent the sale.

References

External links
Superstore plan at poet's historic home

1937 births
Living people
People educated at Eton College
Coldstream Guards officers
Barons in the Peerage of the United Kingdom
William
Deputy Lieutenants of Devon
People from Ottery St Mary
Eldest sons of British hereditary barons
Coleridge